The East Junior Football League, also known as the Edinburgh & District Junior League, the Midlothian Junior League and the Lothians Junior League, was a football league competition operated in Edinburgh, the Lothians and Falkirk under the Scottish Junior Football Association. It had fluctuations in membership and territory but had a continuous operation as the top league in the east of Scotland until a merger in 2002; it existed as the Lothians District for a further four years as a second-tier league before the name was discontinued in 2006.

History
Junior football competitions had been organised in the Edinburgh area since the 1890s, with a Edinburgh & District Junior League formed in 1892 followed by other small groups in each part of the Lothians region surrounding the city; by the 1910s, the Midlothian Junior League emerged as the strongest of these, drawing membership from the many small mining communities which regularly produced skilled players and attracted a loyal local support. The East of Scotland Junior League covering all parts was set up in a 1922 reorganisation, but this was at the same time as the formation of the East of Scotland Football League (EoSFL), an unrelated 'senior' organisation below, and more closely linked to, the professional Scottish Football League. The majority of emerging clubs within Edinburgh and those in the Scottish Borders joined the EoSFL rather than the East Juniors, who were unable to successfully agree on a new format in this lopsided geography, with the predominant Midlothian clubs and those in East Lothian breaking away to form a new Midlothian Junior League in 1928. Those in West Lothian found themselves with little option but to apply for this 'rebel' setup, which retained the Midlothian name until its suspension during World War II. After the war, some teams from the defunct Scottish Junior Football League from further afield joined the setup, and the league was again re-named Edinburgh & District but operated with 'West' and 'Mid & East' divisions whose winners would play off for the championship.

Despite the true footballing strength of the area never being fully recognised due to the enduring split between the Juniors and the EoSFL, the Edinburgh & District Junior League was considered sufficiently strong to form the East Region, one of the six 'regions' across Scotland in a re-organisation of Junior football in 1968, requiring little adjustment to its operations (the West/East divisions remained until 1973). The period following the change was successful for the territory in terms of East member clubs reaching the Scottish Junior Cup final, achieving this 9 times (3 wins) in 15 years, compared with 15 appearances (8 wins) in the previous 42 years. This was followed by another strong spell with 7 finals (3 wins) in the 14 years from 1989.

However, the small-town teams in the region had generally declined with the closure of local heavy industry, and the surviving clubs looked to boost their income by playing more matches against the leading teams in other areas. In 2002 the new East Region Superleague was created in the east of the country in combination with the Fife League and the Tayside League. The East setup was retained as a feeder division to the Superleague as the Lothians District along with the other historic areas until 2006, when they were fully integrated into the East Region; the Lothians section became the South Division below the Super League and a new Premier Division. The pattern of local appearances in the Scottish Cup final continued at a similar rate, with 3 of 8 finalists lifting the trophy over a 12-year period.

Later movement of East clubs
In 2018, a large group of East Junior clubs (18 from the old Lothians) joined the East of Scotland (EoSFL) association en masse, aspiring to gain entry to the senior Scottish Professional Football League in future years; This would mean the traditional EoSFL teams and East Juniors could finally be playing together, although with so many teams moving at once, there was not immediate parity, as the new members were placed in a multi-conference system with only one promotion place made available to the Lowland League (where the likes of Spartans had established themselves) and the majority facing some years of battling with their old rivals to make it to the next level. Back in the East Juniors, the remaining teams formed the majority of a new Super League South in 2019 along with those from Fife who had chosen not to switch.

Champions

1922–1968 era
Key:

Notes

1968–2002 era

Notes

List of winners

References

External links
 Final tables spreadsheet at the Scottish Football Historical Archive (updated July 2022)
Non-League Scotland (archive version), with club progression by season (1990 to 2007)
 Scottish Junior FA Structure, Scottish Junior Football Association

1922 establishments in Scotland
2002 disestablishments in Scotland
Sports leagues established in 1922
Sports leagues disestablished in 2002
Defunct Scottish Junior Football Association leagues
Football in Edinburgh
Football in West Lothian
Football in East Lothian
Football in Midlothian
Football in Falkirk (council area)
Scottish Junior Football Association, East Region